Petros I may refer to:

 Pope Peter I of Alexandria, ruled in 300–311
 Petros I, Caucasian Albanian Catholicos in 971–987
 Abraham Petros I Ardzivian, ruled in 1740–1749